Laurence "Laurie" Charles Gallen (born 18 January 1962, in Lower Hutt) is a former male field hockey player from New Zealand, who was a member of the New Zealand National Men's Team that finished seventh at the 1984 Summer Olympics in Los Angeles, California.

References

External links
 

New Zealand male field hockey players
Olympic field hockey players of New Zealand
Field hockey players at the 1984 Summer Olympics
1962 births
Living people
Sportspeople from Lower Hutt